The 2005 Amman bombings were a series of coordinated suicide bomb attacks on three hotel lobbies in Amman, Jordan, on 9 November 2005. The explosions at the Grand Hyatt Hotel, the Radisson SAS Hotel, and the Days Inn started at around 20:50 local time (18:50 UTC) at the Grand Hyatt. The three hotels are frequented by foreign diplomats. The bomb at the Radisson SAS exploded in the Philadelphia Ballroom, where a Jordanian wedding hosting hundreds of guests was taking place. The attacks killed 57 people and injured 115 others.

Al-Qaeda in Iraq was quick to claim the attack. The attack spurred a wave of new anti-terror measures by the Jordanian government.

The attacks

Radisson SAS
At the Radisson SAS Hotel (now known as the "Landmark Hotel"), two suicide bombers (a husband and wife team — Ali Hussein Ali al-Shamari and Sajida Mubarak Atrous al-Rishawi) — entered the Philadelphia Ballroom, where Ashraf Akhras and Nadia Al-Alami, were celebrating their wedding with around 900 Jordanian and Palestinian guests. Sajida al-Rishawi was unable to detonate her belt. Her husband Ali al-Shamari, apparently admonished her and told her to get out of the room. As she was leaving, the lights went out in the ballroom, Ali jumped onto a dining-room table and detonated himself. Among the 38 people killed in the explosion were the fathers of the bride and groom. In addition, the explosion destroyed the ballroom, blew out the large windows bordering the street, and knocked down ceiling panels. The hotel lobby was also affected: ceiling panels and light fixtures collapsed, furniture was destroyed, and the hotel's glass doors were shattered. Cleanup and rebuilding commenced shortly afterwards. The hotel was actually targeted in the 2000 millennium attack plots nearly six years prior, but the plan was foiled.

Grand Hyatt
The second blast happened about 500 yards (457 metres) from the Radisson SAS. It destroyed the hotel's entrance and brought down pillars and ceiling tiles, along with badly damaging the reception and bar areas. After the bomber ordered orange juice in the hotel's coffee shop, he went to another room (possibly to get his explosive belt) and then came back and detonated his bomb. Seven hotel employees were killed in this blast, as were Syrian-American movie producer Moustapha Akkad and his daughter, Rima. Akkad, who is best known for producing the Halloween series of slasher films, was also the producer of Mohammad, Messenger of God. At the time of his death, he was in the early stages of producing a film about Saladin, the Kurdish Muslim leader who expelled the Crusaders from the Levant. Hyatt began cleanup shortly after the attacks and reopened their hotel on 19 November.

Days Inn
At the Days Inn, the bomber entered the restaurant on the hotel's ground floor. He tried to detonate his explosive belt but had trouble; a waiter noticed this and called security. The bomber ran outside the hotel and successfully detonated himself, killing three members of a Chinese military delegation. Property damage at the Days Inn was expected to amount to around $200,000.

Casualties

According to one Jordanian official, Maj. Bashir al-Da'aja, early in the investigation, local authorities confirmed a series of coordinated suicide attacks as the cause of the blasts. Jordanian Deputy Prime Minister Marwan al-Muasher initially announced that at least 67 people had died and 300 people had been injured. However, the Jordanian government subsequently revised the number of casualties down to at least 59 dead and 115 injured.

Among the dead were thirty-six Jordanians, mostly from a Muslim wedding, including the fathers of both the bride and groom. Both the families of the bride and groom were originally from Silat ad-Dhahr, where 18 of the 57 victims killed were also originally from. The rest were six Iraqis, five Palestinians, four Americans, two Arab-Israelis, two Bahrainis, three Chinese delegates of the People's Liberation Army (PLA), one Saudi, and one Indonesian citizen. Famous filmmaker Moustapha Akkad died with his daughter. The Palestinian fatalities included Major-General Bashir Nafeh, the head of military intelligence in the West Bank, Colonel Abed Allun, a high-ranking Preventive Security forces official, Jihad Fatouh, the commercial attache at the Palestinian Embassy in Cairo, and Mosab Khorma, a senior Palestinian-American banker and former Paltel CEO. Both of the Israeli fatalities were Arabs. One was Husam Fathi Mahajna, a businessman from Umm al-Fahm, the other was an unidentified resident of East Jerusalem.

Suspects
Jordanian police initially stated that there were at least four attackers (the fourth, a female, was later captured), including a couple. A number of Iraqis were among the more than 100 suspects who were arrested in the following days. Police claimed to have found maps that were used in planning the attack. On 12 November, Jordan's Deputy Prime Minister Marwan Muasher confirmed that the attackers were Iraqi and that there were only three suicide bombers.

On 13 November, King Abdullah announced the arrest of a woman believed to be a fourth would-be suicide bomber, whose explosive belt failed to detonate. The three dead suicide bombers were identified, and their names were announced by Deputy Prime Minister Muasher. They were Ali Hussein Ali al-Shamari (SAS Radisson), Rawad Jassem Mohammed Abed (Grand Hyatt), and Safaa Mohammed Ali (Days Inn). The woman in custody was identified as Sajida Mubarak Atrous al-Rishawi. She was married to al-Shamari and intended to blow herself up at the Radisson. Muasher also said that she was the sister of a close aide of Abu Musab al-Zarqawi. Rishawi was executed in February 2015 in response to the murder of Jordanian air force pilot Muath al-Kasasbeh by ISIL.

Perpetrators 
An internet statement released the day after claimed that the bombers were: Abu Khabib, Abu Muaz, Abu Omaira and Om Omaira, all Iraqis.

Al-Qaeda in Iraq immediately claimed the attack on a website, saying they were trying to hit "American and Israeli intelligence and other Western European governments".

The Radisson hotel was previously an Islamist target during the 2000 millennium attack plots. Jordanian police foiled the original attempt after arresting Khadr Abu Hoshar, a Palestinian militant, along with 15 others on 12 December 1999. It is believed that some of the hotels are frequented by American, Israeli, and European military contractors, journalists, business people, and diplomats, and the city itself has long been described as a "gateway" for Westerners into Baghdad and Iraq at large, leading many to entertain the possibility of a connection between the Amman bombings and the War in Iraq.

Response

Domestic

 - King Abdullah II cut a state visit to Kazakhstan short and returned to Jordan, where he pledged that "justice will pursue the criminals" and condemned the attacks. King Abdullah also canceled an upcoming visit to Israel.

Jordanians reacted to the bombings with outrage. Several hundred people in Amman participated in protests against the bombings, chanting "burn in hell, Abu Musab al-Zarqawi". King Abdullah and Queen Rania visited several victims of the bombings in hospital. The King said "The pain you felt for the loss of your beloved ones, who were killed for no crime they committed, was shared by all Jordanians, regardless of their origins or religions." A relative of one of the victims presented a copy of the Qur'an to Abdullah during his visit to the hospital.

The family of Abu Musab al-Zarqawi, the al-Khalayleh tribe, took out half-page advertisements in Jordan's three main newspapers, to denounce him and his actions. 57 members of the al-Khalayleh family, including al-Zarqawi's brother and cousin, also reiterated their strong allegiance to the king. The ads said,"As we pledge to maintain homage to King Abdullah and to our precious Jordan ... we denounce in the clearest terms all the terrorist actions claimed by the so-called Ahmed Fadheel Nazzal al-Khalayleh, who calls himself Abu-Musab al-Zarqawi ... We announce, and all the people are our witnesses, that we - the sons of the al-Khalayleh tribe - are innocent of him and all that emanates from him, whether action, assertion or decision. ... We sever links with him until doomsday."

International

 United Nations - Secretary-General Kofi Annan had planned to visit Jordan on 10 November 2005, but postponed the trip in light of the bombings. Kofi Annan issued a statement "strongly condemning" the attacks, and underscoring the need for additional security measures against terrorist attacks worldwide.

 - A spokesman for the White House called the bombings "a heinous act of terror." Secretary of State Condoleezza Rice called the bombings a "great tragedy" that show "the very difficult war that we're fighting." President George W. Bush said "The bombing should remind all of us that there's an enemy in the world that is willing to kill innocent people, willing to bomb a wedding celebration in order to advance their cause." The New York City Police Department had Brandon del Pozo, a newly stationed overseas intelligence officer, working in Amman. He investigated the incident on behalf of New York City, rather than the US federal government, to ascertain what vulnerabilities it might reveal in the way the city protected its hotels from similar threats.

New anti-terror measures
After the incident, Jordanian government pledged to take new anti-terror measures to ensure that this would not happen again.

Notes

External links

BBC News report
CBS News report
CNN report
Fox News report
Jerusalem Post report
MSNBC report
New York Times report
Reuters report
RTÉ News report
SBS Australia report
Woman bomber in Amman hotel blasts arrested
Slide Show created by: Laith Al-Faraj

Suicide bombings in Jordan
Terrorist incidents in Asia in 2005
November 2005 events in Asia
21st century in Amman
Mass murder in 2005
2005 crimes in Jordan
Iraq–Jordan relations
Attacks on hotels in Asia
Crime in Amman
Terrorist attacks attributed to al-Qaeda in Iraq
Islamic terrorist incidents in 2005
2000s murders in Jordan
2005 murders in Asia
Explosions in 2005
Terrorist incidents in Jordan in the 2000s
Attacks on weddings
Hotel bombings
Massacres in Jordan